The 2017 International U-21 Thanh Niên Newspaper Cup was the 11th edition of the International U-21 Thanh Niên Newspaper Cup, the friendly international youth championship organised by Thanh Niên Newspaper.

Group stage

Knockout stage

Third place play-off

Final

Goalscorers
4 goals

 Rimu Matsuoka

2 goals

 Ryotaro Yamamoto
 Hashimoto Kento
 Kamiyama Kyousuke
 Rittidet Phensawat
 Trần Bảo Toàn
 Trần Ngọc Sơn
 Nguyễn Trần Việt Cường
 Lê Văn Sơn
 Aee Soe
 Kyaw Myint Win

1 goals

 Nguyễn Khắc Khiêm
 Trương Tiến Anh
 Triệu Việt Hưng
 Đinh Thanh Bình
 Settawut Wongsai
 Sorawit Panthong
 Sirimongkhon Jitbanjong
 Nattawut Suksum
 Takashi Abe
 Yota Maejima
 Koki Saito
 Saito Kosuke
 Hein Htet Aung
 Shwe Ko

See also
 International U-21 Thanh Niên Newspaper Cup

U-21 Thanh Nien